Anti-Japan Tribalism (반일종족주의, 反日種族主義) is a book written by Lee Young-hoon, Joung An-ki, Kim Nak-nyeon, Kim Yong-sam, Ju Ik-jong, and Lee Woo-yeon. It was published by Miraesa on July 10, 2019. It was subtitled "The Root of the Korean Crisis" (대한민국 위기의 근원). The Japanese version, published on November 14, 2019, is subtitled "The Root of Japan-South Korea Crisis" (日韓危機の根源).

The book is based on a series of lectures delivered on the web-based Rhee Syngman TV, of which Lee is the host. The Japanese version was published by Bungeishunjū Ltd. in November 2019 and immediately became a bestseller (No. 1 at Amazon on the day of publication). Bungeishunjū announced it had sold 200,000 copies within a week.

Content 
Described as "anti-Japan tribalism," the book posits that there is a shamanistic mentality in a small minority of South Korean people who regard Japan as their primary enemy. Such a mentality, the authors argue, gave rise to some anti-Japan arguments among some South Koreans. In the book’s prologue titled "A Country of Lies," Lee Young-hoon speaks critically of the people who lie, the politics which lie, the scholarship of lies, and the trials of lies. According to this book, the lies are particularly noticeable in some instances of the ROK's national history. Lee and the co-authors thus elucidate how a minority of people in their country has created a small number of forged historical accounts. The book became a bestseller in South Korea as 130,000 copies were sold.

Essentially, the book argues that the official history of the ROK has never been empirical. Anti-Japanism has been a dogma for a minority in post-independence South Korea. As such, some anti-Japan forgeries were produced to dramatize the ROK's national history. Critical of such falsification, the book argues that some South Korean scholars, journalists, novelists, artists, activists, and politicians all contributed to this process.

Anti-Japan Tribalism is an attempt by some South Korean scholars to argue that there is a distorted historical narrative in their own country. Based on their opinion, the authors discuss some anti-Japan arguments. The book "has a potential to dismantle the ROK's official history, the one that has been taught as right."

As discussed by Lee Woo-yeon, the book’s co-author and researcher at the Naksungdae Institute of Economic Research, Japan’s better wages and employment opportunities attracted 100,000 to 200,000 Korean workers each year through the 1930s and the early 1940s. Moreover, there was little wage discrimination during the war, when Japanese companies were in need of Korean workers.

Table of contents 
The table of contents of this book, in Japanese edition, is as following:

Preface to the Japanese Edition
Preface
Prologue: A Nation of Lies
Part 1: Memory of Tribalism
1. Absurd Arirang
2. A pistol in one hand, a surveying instrument in another hand
3. Did you say they plundered the land?
4. The approach of Japanese colonial administration
5. Myth of “the forced mobilization”
6. Was it really “forced labor” and “slave labor”?
7. Fictiveness of the wage discrimination against Koreans
8. Who are they, special army volunteers?
9. Originally, there was nothing to claim: The truth about the claim agreement
10. Stupid and shameless intrepid opposition against Korea-Japan talks
Part 2: Symbol and Fantasy of Tribalism
11. Inside facts of the myth surrounding Mt. Paektu
12. Dok-do, the supreme symbol of anti-Japan tribalism
13. The truth about the iron stakes myth
14. Dismantling of the former governor-general’s office building: Deleting the ROK's history
15. Fraudulent drama called the liquidation of pro-Japanese vestiges
16. A never ending story: "Compensation! Compensation! Compensation!"
17. Theology of anti-Japan tribalism
Part 3: Comfort Women, a Bastion of Tribalism
18. Comfort women within us
19. Establishment and culture of the registered prostitute system
20. The truth about the issue of Japanese military’s comfort women
21. In more than 40 years after the liberation, the issue of comfort women has not existed
22. Until the day when the Korea-Japan relations fail
Epilogue: Retribution of the Anti-Japan Tribalism
Commentary: A Patriotism Interrogated by "Anti-Japan Tribalism"

Controversy 

A confidant of President Moon Jae-in and a short-lived Minister of Justice, Cho Kuk criticized, "This book denies anti-humanist actions conducted by Imperial Japan during the World War II, such as wartime forced labor and sexual slavery," and called it "disgusting" in a Facebook post. Lee Young-hoon responded to Cho's criticism, "it is nasty propaganda that is not worth mentioning." He also said, "I don't think Cho really read my book. He should criticize the book after analyzing its logic and reasoning."

Hong Jun-pyo mentioned on his Facebook, "I think this book is inconsistent with our common sense about the Japan's cadastral surveys, installation of iron stakes, wartime forced labor, and comfort women issues. It seems to be consistent with historical views to support Japanese ruling in Korean Peninsula."

Professors from various South Korean universities co-authored a comprehensive critique on the book, titled Japanese Imperialist Tribalism and published in October 2019.

Lee Woo-yeon was funded by a Japanese far-right groups (일본 극우단체), according to a report by the Kyunghyang Shinmun.

Yuji Hosaka published a critique on the book in April 2020, arguing that the authors are "New Pro-Japanese Collaborators" (신친일파).

Footnotes

See also 
Chinilpa
Tochak Waegu
Japan–Korea disputes
Special law to redeem pro-Japanese collaborators' property
O Sonfa

External links 
 

Anti-Japanese sentiment in Korea
South Korean books
2019 non-fiction books